Edward William Osborne  (January 5, 1845 - July 5, 1926) was the second bishop of the Episcopal Diocese of Springfield.

Biography
Edward William Osborne was born in Calcutta, India, on January 5, 1845, son of Francis Osborne and Louisa White. He was educated at Worcester College, Oxford, graduating in 1869. He  was ordained deacon in 1869, and priest in 1870. He became curate of Highworth in 1869 and then of Kenn, Devon, in 1872. He then served as a priest of the Society of St. John the Evangelist in Boston from 1878 to 1904.

In 1904, Osborne was elected Coadjutor Bishop of Springfield, and was consecrated to the episcopate on October 23, 1904. He became diocesan bishop in 1906, and retiring as Bishop of Springfield in 1916. He died in San Diego, California.

See also 
List of bishops of the Episcopal Church in the United States of America

References

External links 
 

1845 births
1926 deaths
Episcopal bishops of Springfield